William or Bill Mayer may refer to:

 Bill Mayer (born 1951), American illustrator
 William Mayer (composer) (1925–2017), American composer
 William A. Mayer (f. 1956–1959), American polo player
 William Daniel Mayer (born 1941), former member of the Maryland House of Delegates
 William E. Mayer, investment banker and former owner of the Hartford Colonials
 William V. Mayer (1920–1989), American biologist and educator

See also
 William Meyer (disambiguation)
 William Moyer (1933–2002), author and organizer in the 1966 Chicago Freedom Movement